1 Corinthians 13 is the thirteenth chapter of the First Epistle to the Corinthians in the New Testament of the Christian Bible. It is authored by Paul the Apostle and Sosthenes in Ephesus. This chapter covers the subject of Love. In the original Greek, the word  is used throughout the chapter. This is translated into English as "charity" in the King James version; but the word "love" is preferred by most other translations, both earlier and more recent.

Text
The original text was written in Koine Greek. This chapter is divided into 13 verses.

Agape 

Chapter 13 of 1 Corinthians is one of many definitional sources for the word  when used to refer to divine love. Introducing his homage to love in 1 Corinthians 11:31, Paul describes  as "a more excellent way".

"Through a glass, darkly"
1 Corinthians 13:12 contains the phrase , which was translated in the 1560 Geneva Bible as "For now we see through a glass darkly" (without a comma). This wording was used in the 1611 KJV, which added a comma before "darkly". This passage has inspired the titles of many works, with and without the comma.

The Greek word  (genitive;), here translated "glass", is ambiguous, possibly referring to a mirror or a lens. Influenced by Strong's Concordance, many modern translations conclude that this word refers specifically to a mirror. Example English language translations include:

 "Now we see but a poor reflection as in a mirror" (New International Version)
 "What we see now is like a dim image in a mirror" (Good News Bible)

Paul's usage is in keeping with rabbinic use of the term , a borrowing from the Latin . One way to preserve this ambiguity is to use the English cognate, speculum. Rabbi Judah ben Ilai (2nd century) was quoted as saying "All the prophets had a vision of God as He appeared through nine specula" while "Moses saw God through one speculum." The Babylonian Talmud states similarly "All the prophets gazed through a speculum that does not shine, while Moses our teacher gazed through a speculum that shines."

Other notable passages

There are other passages from 1 Corinthians 13 that have been influential. Perhaps the most significant portion of 1 Corinthians 13 is the revered passage that defines love and indicates how Christians should love others.

Verse 1
1 Corinthians 13, verse 1: "Though I speak with the tongues of men and of angels, but have not love, I have become sounding brass or a clanging cymbal."

Bob Dylan paraphrases verse 1 in his song 'Dignity': "I heard the tongues of angels and the tongues of men... wasn't any difference to me."

Verses 4–8
Verses 4–8, and 13 are frequently read during wedding ceremonies.

In the King James Version, instead of "love", the word used in 1 Corinthians 13:4–8 is "charity".

Verse 11

 1 Corinthians 13:11 was quoted in the 1995 anime Ghost in the Shell.
 The verse is quoted by Emmanuel "Cereal Killer" Goldstein (Matthew Lillard) in the 1995 film Hackers.
 The verse is quoted by former slave trader Rodrigo Mendoza (Robert De Niro), when he is admitted into the Jesuit order in the 1986 film The Mission.
 U.S. President Barack Obama referenced verse 11 in his inaugural address to the nation on January 20, 2009.
 The verse is quoted by Dakin Matthews in the 1991 film Child's Play 3.
 This verse is quoted by the character Wilson in the sitcom Home Improvement on the episode "For Whom the Belch Tolls".
 The verse is quoted by Todd Rundgren in the song "Real Man" from his 1975 album Initiation.
 The verse is referenced in Episode 34 of Season 2 of In Treatment. The character Walter says that his parents' grief after the death of his brother forced him to 'put away childish things'. Walter's therapist Paul Weston notes that, unlike the narrator of Corinthians, Walter was still a boy and not yet a man when this happened.
 The verse is referenced in the Dirty Projectors song Stillness is the Move: "When the child was just a child, it did not know what it was. Like a child it had no habits, no opinions about anything."
 The verse was referenced by author C. S. Lewis in his famous quote "When I became a man I put away childish things, including the fear of childishness and the desire to appear very grown up."

Verse 13

 US President Franklin D. Roosevelt took the oath at his inauguration in 1933, with his hand on his family Bible, open to 1 Corinthians 13.
 Verse 13 is paraphrased in country singer Alan Jackson's 2001 hit "Where Were You (When the World Stopped Turning)".
 British Prime Minister Tony Blair read 1 Corinthians 13 at the funeral of Diana, Princess of Wales in 1997.

Abridged verses
1 Corinthians 13, verses 2, 3, 4, 11 and 13 are introspectively digested aloud by ex-slave-trader mercenary, transitioned to Jesuit missionary, Rodrigo Mendoza (played by Robert De Niro) in the Robert Bolt-penned 1986 cinematographic Oscar winner The Mission, directed by Roland Joffé.

In popular culture

 Quoted by James Mason playing the dying revolutionary Johnny McQueen, in Carol Reed's 1947 film Odd Man Out.
 George S. Patton's poem "Through a Glass, Darkly," also quoted by George C. Scott (portraying Patton) in the 1969 Francis Ford Coppola film Patton.
 Philip K. Dick's 1962 novel The Man in the High Castle and 1977 novel A Scanner Darkly.
 Swedish filmmaker Ingmar Bergman's twenty-third film as a director was titled , ('As in a Mirror'), and released internationally under the title Through a Glass Darkly.
 Soundtrack of the film Three Colors: Blue composed by Zbigniew Preisner features a solo soprano singing the epistle in Greek (in a piece titled "Song for the Unification of Europe").
 The Renaissance composer Orlando di Lasso set verses 11–13 in his sacred motet "."
 A paraphrase of the text is the basis for the song "Love Is the Law" composed and sung by Australian musician Paul Kelly.
 Symphony No.6 "Liturgical" for baritone, choir and orchestra by Andrei Yakovlevich Eshpai (1989).
 Joni Mitchell uses much of the text in 20th-century vernacular, including "through a glass darkly" in her song "Love" from her 1982 album Wild Things Run Fast, and fully -and dramatically -orchestrated on her 2002 retrospective Travelogue.
 The Rolling Stones paraphrase the verse in the title of their 1969 compilation album Through the Past, Darkly (Big Hits Vol. 2).
 Characters in Japanese filmmaker Sion Sono's 2008 film Love Exposure quote the chapter in its entirety and discuss its meaning during scenes at the end of the film's third hour.
 Macklemore uses the verse "Love is patient. Love is kind" in his 2012 song, "Same Love".
 Video game developer Arkane Studios paraphrased the title of Lewis Carroll's book by linking it with the verse, as the title for a chapter in their game Prey: "Through the Looking Glass Darkly".
 The text is drawn on / paraphrased in Lauryn Hill's song "Tell Him" hidden on The Miseducation of Lauryn Hill.
 Car Seat Headrest uses verses 8–12 at the end of the song "Famous Prophets (Stars)" on the album Twin Fantasy (Face to Face).
 James Baldwin quotes verse 11 in the fifth to last paragraph of Giovanni's Room.
 The lyrics of Legião Urbana's song "Monte Castelo" are a mix of this text and Camões' "Sonnet 11".
 The Hebrew translation of the Chapter was composed in its entirety by the Israeli Avraham Tal in 2008, in the album Avraham Tal. The song is named after the first words of the chapter "Im BaLeshonot". The album states that the words are "from the sources", but it was not mentioned that the source is in the New Testament.

See also
 Form of the Good: Socrates notes in The Republic (508d–e) that "good is yet more prized"
 In a Glass Darkly

References

External links

 Full chapter at Oremus (NRSV and KJV)
  King James Bible - Wikisource
 English Translation with Parallel Latin Vulgate
 Online Bible at GospelHall.org (ESV, KJV, Darby, American Standard Version, Bible in Basic English)
 Multiple bible versions at Bible Gateway (NKJV, NIV, NRSV etc.)
 Full Christian sermon on verse 11

 
13
Philosophy of love